Aegista vulgivaga is a species of air-breathing land snail, a terrestrial pulmonate gastropod mollusk in the family Camaenidae. Snails in this species create and use love darts as part of their mating behavior. The species can host sporocysts of Dicrocoelium

Distribution
This species of snail is endemic to Japan.

References

 Images at: 
 Taxonomy at: 

vulgivaga
Gastropods described in 1890